Below is the list of tornadoes that were confirmed by National Weather Service officials during the tornado outbreak of April 22–25, 2010.

April 22 event

April 23 event

April 24 event

April 25 event

External links
 Satellite images from the 24 April 2010 tornado outbreak (CIMSS Satellite Blog)
Photo gallery of storm damage from the Sun Herald
Discovery Channel's Stormchasers: Devastating Yazoo City, MS tornado – Video of the Mississippi tornado, uploaded to YouTube by Discovery Channel

References

F4 tornadoes by date
04-22
Tornado outbreak